Itatodon is an extinct genus of primitive mammal known from the Bathonian aged Itat Formation of Russia. The genus is named after the formation, with the species being named after Leonid Petrovich Tatarinov who described the first docodont
from Asia. It is known from a holotype right lower molar and referred isolated right lower molar and fragment of the left lower molar. When it was first described, it was thought to be a docodontan, but some recent phylogenetic studies have assigned it, along with its close relative Paritatodon to Shuotheriidae, while others continue to consider it a docodont.

References 

Bathonian life
Jurassic mammals of Asia
Jurassic Russia
Fossils of Russia
Fossil taxa described in 2005
Taxa named by Alexander O. Averianov
Prehistoric mammal genera